Virginia Community Unit School District 64 is a unified school district located in the city of Virginia, the county seat of western Illinois' Cass County.
It reports to the state as two schools: Virginia Elementary School for pre-kindergarten through fifth grade, and Virginia Junior/Senior High School for sixth grade through twelfth grade.

 the superintendent was Gary DePatis, the junior-senior high school principal was Aaron Llewellyn, and the elementary school principal was Kara Bowman.

The mascot of the district's high school is the redbird.  Among the extracurricular activities are Future Farmers of America and Scholastic Bowl.  Sports include baseball and softball; basketball; cross country; football; and volleyball.

References

External links
 
 from 1998 to September 2012

Education in Cass County, Illinois
School districts in Illinois